Storozhynets (see below for other names) is a small city located in Chernivtsi Raion, Chernivtsi Oblast of western Ukraine, north of the border with Romania. It hosts the administration of Storozhynets urban hromada, one of the hromadas of Ukraine. Population: 

Storozhynets is located in the historic region of Bukovina, which has been governed by Moldavia (before 1774), the Austrian empire (1774–1918), Romania (1918–1940 and 1941–1944), the USSR (1940–1941 and 1944–1991) and Ukraine (since 1991).

Other names
Other names for the city include:
Storozynetz (German)
Storojineț (Romanian)
Strozhnitz (Yiddish)
Storožynec (Slovak)
Storożyniec (Polish)
Storozhinets (Сторожинец, Russian)

History
Storozhynets was a part of the Principality of Moldavia and was first mentioned in 1448. The first inhabitants were a settlement of loggers. In 1774, the region was annexed by Austria, as the Duchy of Bukovina. It was marked with great changes as Austrians and Germans arrived en masse. There were schools with German, Romanian, and Ukrainian as their languages of instruction.

Since the second half of the 19th century, a rapid population growth began with the arrival of Jews to the city, as well as Hungarian and Romanian businessmen, legal and banking officials most of whom were Jews.  In 1854 Storozhynets received the status of city. By the end of the 19th century and early 20th century, the city was populated mainly by Jews.

In 1903 in Storozhynets opened a private school. On May 21, 1904, the area around Storozhynets became a county. Trade, industry, agriculture, science, education, and culture developed at a rapid pace. On 15/28 November 1918, soon after the end World War I, the Union of Bukovina with Romania was decided by the General Congress of Bukovina, and the town became part of the Kingdom of Romania. On 18 December 1918, Storojineț County was created, with Storojineț as its capital. In 1921, Romanian became the official language, and the Ukrainian language was not used any more in the administration.

On 28 June 1940, Northern Bukovina was occupied by Soviet troops. After the start of the war against the Soviet Union, in June 1941, Northern Bucovina was reintegrated into the Kingdom of Romania. Between 1941 and 1943, a great part of the Jewish population was killed or deported to concentration camps in Transnistria. In 1944, the area passed again under Soviet control.

Until 18 July 2020, Storozhynets served as an administrative center of Storozhynets Raion. The raion was abolished in July 2020 as part of the administrative reform of Ukraine, which reduced the number of raions of Chernivtsi Oblast to three. The area of Storozhynets Raion was merged into Chernivtsi Raion.

Demographics

1930 Romanian census
 Romanians 3,390 (38.98%)
 Jews 2,480 (28.52%)
 Polish 1,017 (11.69%)
 Ruthenians/Ukrainians 853 (9.81%)
 Germans 655 (7.53%)
Total 8,695

Natives

Iancu Flondor (1865–1924), Romanian politician who advocated Bukovina's union with the Kingdom of Romania.
George Grigorovici (1871-1950), Romanian politician
Radu Paladi (1927–2013), Romanian composer, pianist, and conductor. 
Rabbi Shulem Gershon Ginsburgh the last Rabbi of Strozhnitz, he was the son in law of Rabbi Yisroel Yaakov of Chust.
Grand Rabbi Yisochor Ber Rosenbaum of Strozhnitz, author of Divrei Yisochor (d. 1980), son of Rabbi Issomor Rosenbaum of Nadvorna, son-in-law of Rabbi Yisachar Bertchi Leifer of Nadvorna-Satmar.
Rabbi Yitschok Yaakov Dovid Hager of Strozhnits, son of Imrei Boruch of Vizhnitz.

Gallery

See also
Bukovina
Duchy of Bukovina

References

External links
History of the Jews in Bukovina(German: Geschichte der Juden in der Bukowina)
Storozhynets Jews Memorial Web Page

Cities of district significance in Ukraine
Bukovina
Duchy of Bukovina
Capitals of former Romanian counties
Ținutul Suceava
Shtetls
Holocaust locations in Ukraine
Cities in Chernivtsi Oblast